Lev Ivanovich Yashin (22 October 1929 – 20 March 1990), nicknamed the "Black Spider" or the "Black Panther", was a Soviet professional footballer regarded by many as the greatest goalkeeper in the history of the sport. He was known for his athleticism, positioning, stature, bravery, imposing presence in goal, and acrobatic reflex saves.
He was also deputy chairman of the Football Federation of the Soviet Union.

Yashin earned status for revolutionising the goalkeeping position by imposing his authority on the entire defence. A vocal presence in goal, he shouted orders at his defenders, came off his line to intercept crosses and also ran out to meet onrushing attackers, done at a time when goalkeepers spent the 90 minutes standing in the goal waiting to be called into action. His performances made an indelible impression on a global audience at the 1958 World Cup, the first to be broadcast internationally. He dressed head to toe in apparent black (in truth very dark blue), thus earning his nickname the "Black Spider", which enhanced his popularity. 
 
Yashin appeared in four World Cups from 1958 to 1970, and in 2002 was chosen on the FIFA Dream Team of the history of World Cups. In 1994, he was chosen for the FIFA World Cup All-Time Team, and in 1998 was chosen as a member of the World Team of the 20th Century. According to FIFA, Yashin saved over 150 penalty kicks in professional football — more than any other goalkeeper. He also kept over 270 clean sheets in his career, winning a gold medal at the 1956 Olympic football tournament, and the 1960 European Championships. In 1963, Yashin received the Ballon d'Or, the only goalkeeper ever to receive the award. He was additionally named posthumously to the Ballon d'Or Dream Team in 2020, a greatest all-time XI, and was voted the best goalkeeper of the 20th century by the IFFHS. In November 2003, to celebrate UEFA's Jubilee, he was selected as the Golden Player of Russia by the Russian Football Union as their most outstanding player of the past 50 years.

Early life
Yashin was born in Moscow, in a Russian family of industrial workers. When he was 12, World War II forced him to work in a factory to support the war effort. However his health at the age of 18 (after he suffered a nervous breakdown) meant he was unable to work. Thus, he was sent to work in a military factory in Moscow. After being spotted playing for the factory team he was invited to join the Dynamo Moscow youth team.

Club career

Yashin’s debut for Dynamo Moscow came in 1950 in a friendly match. It was not the debut he would have hoped for, as he conceded a soft goal scored straight from a clearance by the opposing keeper. That year he played in only two league games, and did not appear in a senior match again until 1953. But he remained determined, and stayed at Dynamo in the reserves waiting for another opportunity. Yashin also played goalie for the Dynamo ice hockey team during those early years of trying to break into the senior squad. He managed to win a USSR ice hockey cup in 1953 and was third in the USSR ice hockey championship as goalkeeper.

He spent his entire professional football career with Dynamo Moscow, from 1950 to 1970, winning the USSR football championship five times and the Soviet Cup three times. Yashin's club teammate, rival and mentor was Alexei "Tiger" Khomich, the keeper of the Soviet national team, who had become famous for his role in Dynamo Moscow’s British tour. He also internally rivaled goalkeeper Valter Sanaya, who left the club in 1953.

International career

In 1954, Yashin was called up to the Soviet national team, and would go on to gather 78 caps. With the national team he won the 1956 Summer Olympics as well as the first European championship, the 1960 European Nations' Cup. He also played in three World Cups, in 1958, 1962 and 1966. Yashin is credited with four clean sheets out of the 12 games he played in the World Cup finals.

The 1958 World Cup, played in Sweden, put Yashin on the map for his performances, with the Soviet Union advancing to the quarter-finals. In a group stage match against the eventual Cup winners Brazil, the Soviet team lost 2–0. Facing a Brazil team that featured Garrincha and a 17 year old Pelé in attack, Yashin's performance prevented the score from becoming a rout.

Yashin was nominated for Ballon d'Or in 1960 and 1961 and placed fifth and fourth, respectively. In 1962, despite suffering two concussions during the tournament, he once again led the team to a quarter-final finish, before losing to host country Chile. That tournament showed that Yashin was all too human, having made some uncharacteristic mistakes. In the game against Colombia, which the Soviet Union was leading 4–1, Yashin let in a few soft goals, including a goal scored by Marcos Coll directly from a corner kick (the first and the only goal scored directly from a corner in FIFA World Cup history). The game finished in a 4–4 tie, which led the French newspaper L'Équipe to predict the end of Yashin's career. He did, however, make an outstanding save against Chile in the quarter-final. Despite this, the Soviet Union suffered a 2–1 defeat and were eliminated from the World Cup.

Despite the disappointment of the 1962 World Cup, Yashin would bounce back to win the Ballon d'Or in December 1963. One of his best performances that year was the 1963 England v Rest of the World football match, where he made a number of spectacular saves. From that point onward he was known to the world as the "Black Spider" because he wore a distinctive all-black outfit and because it seemed as though he had eight arms to save almost everything. But to his fans, he was always the fearless "Black Panther". He often played wearing a cloth cap of burnt-brick colour. Yashin led the Soviet team to its best showing at the FIFA World Cup, a fourth-place finish in the 1966 World Cup held in England.

Always ready to give advice to his comrades, Yashin even made a fourth trip to the World Cup finals in 1970, held in Mexico, as the third-choice back-up and an assistant coach. The Soviet team again reached the quarter-finals. In 1971, in Moscow, he played his last match for Dynamo Moscow. Lev Yashin's FIFA testimonial match was held at the Lenin Stadium in Moscow with 100,000 fans attending and a host of football stars, including Pelé, Eusébio and Franz Beckenbauer.

Post-playing career
After retiring from playing, Yashin spent almost 20 years in various administrative positions at Dynamo Moscow. A bronze statue of Lev Yashin was erected at the Dynamo Stadium in Moscow.

In 1986, following a thrombophlebitis contracted while he was in Budapest, Yashin underwent the amputation of one of his legs. He died in 1990 of stomach cancer, despite a surgical intervention in an attempt to save his life. He was given a state funeral as a Soviet Honoured Master of Sport.

Yashin was survived by wife Valentina Timofeyevna and daughters Irina and Elena; when Russia hosted the 2018 FIFA World Cup, Valentina was still living in the Moscow apartment that the Soviet state had given her husband in 1964. Yashin has one granddaughter and one surviving grandson; another grandson died in 2002 at age 14 from injuries suffered in a bicycle accident. The surviving grandson, Vasili Frolov, played as a goalkeeper in Dynamo's youth section and was on the books of the senior side, but never played a game with the senior side, retiring from play at age 23. He now runs a goalkeeper training school in Moscow near Spartak Moscow's current stadium.

Style of play and accolades

Considered by many in the sport to be the greatest goalkeeper in the history of the game, Yashin was an imposing presence in goal due to his tall stature, and was highly regarded for his athleticism, agility, positional sense, bravery, and exceptional reflexes, which enabled him to produce acrobatic and spectacular saves. Yashin remains the only goalkeeper to have won the Ballon d'Or, in 1963. He also stopped 151 penalty kicks during his career, more than any other goalkeeper in history, and kept over 270 clean sheets. For his outstanding service to the people and to his country, Yashin was awarded the Order of Lenin in 1967, the highest award of the USSR.

A vocal and authoritative figure between the posts, Yashin is known for revolutionizing the goalkeeping position: he shouted orders at his defenders, came off his line to intercept crosses, and also ran out to meet onrushing attackers, done at a time when goalkeepers spent the 90 minutes standing in the goal waiting to be called into action. Yashin would always organise the defensive game of his team, often so fiercely that even his wife accused him of yelling too much on the pitch. He rarely captained his teams, as the later accepted custom of appointing a goalkeeper captain was virtually unheard-of in that era, but his leadership on the field was always evident. Yashin was one of the goalkeepers who began the practice of punching balls out in difficult situations instead of trying to catch them. Other novel practices he developed were the quick throw of the ball to begin a counterattack, coming out of the penalty area to anticipate danger, and the command and organisation of the defenders – practices now quite common among goalkeepers. When asked what his secret was, he would reply that the trick was "to have a smoke to calm your nerves, then toss back a strong drink to tone your muscles."

In 1994, FIFA established the Lev Yashin Award for the best goalkeeper at the World Cup finals. FIFA polls named Yashin as the sole goalkeeper in World Team of the 20th Century. World Soccer magazine named him in their 100 Greatest Players of the 20th century. Many commentators consider Yashin the best goalkeeper in the history of football, which has resulted in him being chosen to be the goalkeeper in most of the world-all-time teams (including the FIFA World Cup All-Time Team and the FIFA Dream Team). In 2020 Yashin was named in the Ballon d'Or Dream Team, a greatest all-time XI.

Legacy

The following works are devoted to Yashin:
Song "Вратарь" ("Goalkeeper", 1971) by Vladimir Vysotsky.
Poem "Года летят" ("Years go by") by Robert Rozhdestvensky.
Poem "Вратарь выходит из ворот" ("Goalkeeper is coming out of the goal", 1974) by Yevgeny Yevtushenko.
A Russian-language biopic about his life, entitled Lev Yashin: Goalie of My Dreams, was released on 22 October 2017. Its director Oleg Kapanets previously produced Gagarin: First in Space.
 Statues of Yashin were unveiled at both Luzhniki Stadium, in 1997, and Central Dynamo Stadium, in 1999.
 The new billion-dollar Dynamo Moscow stadium, VTB Arena, is officially called Lev Yashin Stadium.
Several streets are named after Yashin in Russian cities, and there are multiple monuments of Yashin, both in Russia and abroad.
Yashin features in EA Sports' FIFA football video game series: he was added as an Ultimate Team Icon in FIFA 18, joined by many other legends of the sport.
In 2018 Yashin appeared on a new 100-ruble commemorative banknote from the Central Bank of Russia celebrating the 2018 FIFA World Cup; Yashin also appeared on the official World Cup poster released in November 2017.

Ice hockey career
Yashin also played ice hockey (also as a goalie) and he won the Soviet Cup in March 1953. He stopped playing ice hockey in 1954 to concentrate on his football career.

Quotes

Career statistics

Club

International

Other statistics
 812 career games played
 estimated to have made over 150 penalty saves during his career
 326 games played for Dynamo Moscow main line-up (football team)
 74 caps for the USSR national team (70 goals conceded)
 12 caps at the World Cup (4 clean sheets)
 2 FIFA 'Best of the World XI' appearances (in 1963 vs England, in 1968 vs Brazil)
 270 career clean sheets

Honours

Football

Dynamo Moscow
 Soviet Top League: 1954, 1955, 1957, 1959, 1963
 Soviet Cup: 1953, 1966–67, 1970; runner-up: 1955

Soviet Union
 UEFA European Football Championship: 1960; runner-up: 1964
 Olympic Games Gold Medal: 1956
 FIFA World Cup Fourth place: 1966

Individual
 European Goalkeeper of the Year: 1956, 1957, 1959, 1960, 1961, 1963, 1964, 1965, 1966
UEFA European Championship Team of the Tournament: 1960, 1964
 USSR Goalkeeper of the year: 1960, 1963, 1966
 Ballon d'Or: 1963
 World Soccer World XI: 1963, 1964, 1966, 1967
FIFA XI: 1963, 1968
Europe XI: 1964, 1964, 1965 
European football Oscars: 1963-64 
World XI selected by italian press. 1960, 1961 
 Order of Lenin
 Silver Olympic Order
 FIFA Order of Merit
Placar's All-Time Team
Placar's 100 Stars of the Century: #11
 FIFA World Cup All-Time Team
Planète Foot's All-Time Team
France Football's Football Player of the Century: #10
Planète Foot's 50 Best Players of all Time
Venerdì's All-Time Team
Venerdì's 100 Magnificent
World Soccer's 100 Greatest Footballers of All Time: #11
 World Team of the 20th Century
Voetbol International's Team of the Century
Voetbol International's World Stars by Raf Willems
Jornal A Tarde All-Time Team
Placar's 100 Stars of the World Cup: #23
O Estado de São Paulo All-Time Team
 Berlin-Britz Team of the Decade (1960s)
World Hall of Fame of Soccer
 FIFA Goalkeeper of the 20th Century
 FIFA World Cup Dream Team
 Golden Player of Russia
 World Soccer Greatest XI of all time
 World Sports dream team of the past 20 years: 1970
 IFFHS Legends
IFFHS World Goalkeeper of the Century
IFFHS European Goalkeeper of the Century
 Ballon d'Or Dream Team
 IFFHS All-time Men's Dream Team
 IFFHS All-time Europe Men's Dream Team

Ice hockey
Dynamo Moscow
 Soviet Cup: 1953

See also

 Lev Yashin Club

References

External links

 
 
 
 

1929 births
1990 deaths
1958 FIFA World Cup players
1960 European Nations' Cup players
1962 FIFA World Cup players
1964 European Nations' Cup players
1966 FIFA World Cup players
1970 FIFA World Cup players
Association football goalkeepers
Ballon d'Or winners
Deaths from cancer in Russia
Deaths from stomach cancer
Dynamo sports society athletes
FC Dynamo Moscow players
Footballers at the 1956 Summer Olympics
Heroes of Socialist Labour
Olympic footballers of the Soviet Union
Olympic gold medalists for the Soviet Union
Olympic medalists in football
Russian footballers
Soviet footballers
Soviet ice hockey players
Soviet Top League players
Soviet Union international footballers
Footballers from Moscow
UEFA European Championship-winning players
Medalists at the 1956 Summer Olympics
Russian State University of Physical Education, Sport, Youth and Tourism alumni
Deaths from cancer in the Soviet Union
Association football coaches